The Glade within the Grove is a 1996 novel by Australian author David Foster. It won the 1997 Miles Franklin Award.

Awards

References

Middlemiss.org

1996 Australian novels
Miles Franklin Award-winning works
Fourth Estate books